The Phantom of the Opera is a 1910 novel by Gaston Leroux.

The Phantom of the Opera may also refer to:

Characters
 Erik (The Phantom of the Opera), the title character of the novel and its adaptations

Theatre
 The Phantom of the Opera (1986 musical), adapted by Andrew Lloyd Webber
 "The Phantom of the Opera" (song), from the 1986 musical
 Phantom of the Opera (Ken Hill musical), adapted in 1976 by Ken Hill

Film and television
 The Phantom of the Opera (1925 film), a silent film starring Lon Chaney
 Phantom of the Opera (1943 film), a film starring Claude Rains
 The Phantom of the Opera (1962 film), a British film starring Herbert Lom
 , a 1983 TV film starring Maximilian Schell
 The Phantom of the Opera (1989 film), a film starring Robert Englund
 The Phantom of the Opera (1998 film), an Italian film directed by Dario Argento
 The Phantom of the Opera (2004 film), an adaptation of the Andrew Lloyd Webber musical
 The Phantom of the Opera (2004 soundtrack), a soundtrack album from the 2004 film
 The Phantom of the Opera (miniseries), a 1990 two-part American TV miniseries starring Charles Dance
 The Phantom of the Opera at the Royal Albert Hall, a 2011 British filmed production of the Andrew Lloyd Webber musical

Other uses
 The Phantom of the Opera (audio drama), a 2007 audio drama for radio, adapted by Barnaby Edwards
 The Phantom of the Opera (pinball), a pinball machine by Data East
 Phantom of the Opera, an album by Wing
 "Phantom of the Opera", a song by Iron Maiden from their 1980 album Iron Maiden
 "The Phantom Opera Ghost", a song by Iced Earth from their 2001 album Horror Show

See also
 Phantom (disambiguation)